The Copernicus House in Toruń - a historic, Gothic tenement house which belonged to the Copernicus family in the second half of the 15th century. It is considered by many historians to be the birthplace of Nicolaus Copernicus.

Location 
The tenement house is located in the southern part of the Old Town Complex, at 15/17 Copernicus Street, in the vicinity of the house which was once considered the birthplace of Nicolaus Copernicus. Today it houses the Hotel Gotyk.

History 
The tenement house dates back to 1370 and is what was called a granary house, which in the Middle Ages performed both residential and storage functions.

At the end of the 14th century, the cloth merchant Herbord Platte became the owner of the house. In 1459, Lucas I Watzenrode, Nicolaus Copernicus' grandfather, took over the house from his nephew, Szymon Falbrecht, and soon gave it to his daughter Barbara Watzenrode and her spouse, Nicolaus Copernicus senior. Many historians point to this building as the place where Nicolaus Copernicus was born in 1473. 7 years after Nicolaus Copernicus was born, in 1480, the Copernicus family sold the building to Georg Polnische.

In the nineteenth century, the building was adapted for rental apartments. At that time, its interiors were rebuilt and the facade was plastered.

In 1929 the house was entered in the register of monuments for the first time. It was put on this list again in 1970.

The tenement house was renovated between 1972 and 1973. During the works, its former spatial layout was restored, reconstructing, among others, a tall vestibule with a kitchen corner, a staircase and a wooden suspended room (ground floor). Renovation also included the building's façade decorated with a sharp-edged portal, brick friezes and vertical recesses decorated with traceries.

Since 1973 the building houses the Nicolaus Copernicus Museum.

Interesting facts 

 Copernicus Street used to be called St. Anna Street.
 On June 1, 1971, the Polish Post issued a postage stamp depicting the Copernicus House in Toruń with the face value of 40 gr, in the series "Na szlaku Kopernika" (on Copernicus' trail). Offset printing on chalk paper. Andrzej Heidrich was the designer of the stamp. It remained in circulation until December 31, 1994.

Gallery 
Interior of the building before renovation:

References 

Toruń
Birthplaces of individual people
Nicolaus Copernicus
14th-century establishments in Poland
Buildings and structures completed in 1370
Biographical museums in Poland
Historic house museums in Poland
Museums established in 1973